Alfio Piva Mesén (born 9 January 1940) is a Costa Rican politician, veterinarian, scientist and environmentalist. He was the First Vice President of Costa Rica from 2010 to 2014. The Second Vice President during that interval was Luis Liberman.

Piva obtained a Ph.D. in animal physiology from the University of Milan in Italy and co-founded the Veterinary School of the National University of Costa Rica. In 1995 he won the Prince of Asturias Award in Technical and Scientific Research along with his colleagues from INBio.

References

1940 births
Living people
People from San José, Costa Rica
Vice presidents of Costa Rica
Costa Rican scientists
Costa Rican people of Italian descent
University of Milan alumni
National Liberation Party (Costa Rica) politicians
Costa Rican expatriates in Italy